Itumbiara picticollis is a species of beetle in the family Cerambycidae. It was described by Henry Walter Bates in 1881. It is known from Argentina and Brazil.

References

picticollis
Beetles described in 1881